is a Japanese shōnen manga series written and drawn by Satoru Yuiga. It was originally serialized in Monthly GFantasy from 1997 through 2005, and later published in 16 tankōbon volumes by Square Enix from March 18, 2003, to February 27, 2010. The series focuses on Kai Kudō, an "Esper", who is recruited by an organization called Ashurum to become a soldier to purportedly save other psychics from regular humans. After a mission in Gald goes wrong, Kai finds himself living with a man named Yuuki and his adopted sister Asuka. As he learns more about Ashurum, Kai finds himself wondering what their true goals are, and worrying about his ill sister, who is under Ashurum's care.

The series was adapted into a twenty-six episode anime series entitled  by Studio Pierrot. It debuted in Japan on April 1, 2003, on TV Tokyo; the final episode aired on September 23, 2003. Two light novels and three drama CDs related to the series have also been released in Japan.

Broccoli Books licensed the manga series for English-language publication in North America in 2006. ADV Films licensed the anime series for North American broadcast and distribution, with the English dubbed version of the series airing on Anime Network.

Plot
Kai and Hikaru are protected by a corporation called ASHURUM, from a society that fears E's. ASHURUM is 1 of the 12 corporations that rule the world. Found by Eiji, Kai was selected to be in ASHURUM's special force AESES and had to undergo intensive training in different areas, such as combat, hacking, and psychic training.

When Kai had free time he visited Hikaru at the hospital. Hikaru's condition never improved, however. After a year, Shen-long warned Kai that Eiji actually only wanted his sister, because she was said to possess amazing psychic powers, but she was not able to use them due to her illness. Shen-long then went on to tell Kai that Eiji was just hoping that Kai would have those amazing powers too.

Kai did not believe Shen-long and goes on a mission to Gald city, with the other E's, to infiltrate a hideout of guerillas that is said to have been using E's against their will. Kai finds some civilians caught in the middle of the battle. While trying to save a little girl, one of the civilians that is afraid of E's, shoots and kills Kai's partner.

Kai, still shocked from the death of his partner, tries to help the civilians, but meets up with Shen-long. In a rage, Shen-long unleashes a psychic blast that decimates half the city.

Later, Kai, washed up ashore, was found by a girl named Asuka. After being brought back to health, Kai was told by Yuuki, Asuka's brother, that he would not have his psychic powers back to the level they were unless he goes back to ASHURUM. However, after spending some time in the city with its residents, Kai decides to stay with Asuka and Yuuki for a while.
As it turns out, ASHURUM has been brain-washing Kai and the other E's in order to make them more powerful. Eiji plans to use Hikaru to destroy the human race to 'speed up evolution' so that only E's survive.

Characters

Kai Kudō is the series protagonist. Orphaned before the start of the anime, his only remaining family member is his sickly sister Hikaru Kudō, who is noted to have extremely powerful psychic powers. It is also believed by Eiji Sagimiya that Kai also has the potential to become powerful as Hikaru, but either he has not unlocked these powers out of dormancy yet or isn't aware of them. He's also extremely sensitive to sweets, to the point where even the mention or sight of it makes him uneasy. Kai and Hikaru were taken by ASHURUM in order to receive protection from people who hate espers, and in return Kai has to enroll into AESES, a psychic division with similarities to the Special forces in the U.S. military. However, his stay was rendered short after a failed mission that resulted in the death of his partner and a devastating psychic explosion that throws him into Gald, a run-down city run by crime syndicates. Although he was met with distrust from Yuki Tokugawa, a Gald resident who hates espers, Kai is eventually accepted by him and his little foster sister Asuka Tokugawa, a young empath who develops a crush on him. It is during his stay in Gald where Kai starts seeing the kinder side of humanity. Toward the end of the anime, Kai helps his former rival Shen-Long Belvedere in restoring his twin sister's personality, after being informed of ASHURUM's true purposes, and is later aided in rescuing Hikaru from Eiji by Yuki. Kai confronts Eiji on his true motives, and engages in a final decisive battle for the fate of the world. It is not explicitly known what the outcome of the battle was, it is implied that Kai had won but it is hotly debated whether he survived and is somewhere on the other side of the planet or he sacrificed his life to beat Eiji. 

Hikaru Kudō is Kai's orphaned younger sister. Hikaru is an innocent, childlike girl who is an esper harboring immensely powerful psychic abilities, but due to an unknown illness she is unable to use them and remains bedridden for the duration of the anime until the end. Her frail condition led her to being hospitalized in ASHURUM's hospital, where her stay is often frequented by visits from Kai or Eiji, her caretaker. Kai often worries about Hikaru's well-being and occasionally experiences dreams about his younger sister. Later, Hikaru is taken away by Eiji, who wants to use her psychic abilities to wipe out most of Earth's population because he claims that it'll make espers like her "happy". The plan is nearly successful, as Hikaru was put into a machine that enhances her telepathic abilities to the point it can cover and attack a vast area of people, but Kai, who was informed by Shen-Long, and Yuki Tokugawa intervened and rescued her from such a fate. She is later seen in Gald in perfect condition, watching the night stars with Asuka Tokugawa. 

Shen-Long Belvedere is the younger twin brother of Shin-Lu Belvedere, his older sister. He is a very powerful psychic, capable of telekinesis and teleportation. He also hates anyone who gets in his way, especially Kai, with whom he develops an antagonistic rivalry. Shen-Long hates normal humans because of the rough childhood they caused him and Shin-Lu, and is very protective of his sister. Shen-Long is revealed to be telepathically linked to Shin-Lu, after being affected by the intense pain of a telepathic attack that rendered his sister comatose. In a rage, he creates a devastating psychic explosion that wipes out the entire area, causing Kai to end up in Gald. Later, he finds that Shin-Lu had recovered, but was also brainwashed, causing him to search for ways to restore her old personality, siding with Kai to achieve this. Shen-Long also discovers that Eiji took in Hikaru, Kai's younger sister, so he can use her powers to wipe out most of Earth's population. At the end of the anime, Shen-Long engages in a vicious psychic battle with his older sister, and succeeds in snapping her out of her brainwashing at the cost of himself. It is unknown whether Shen-Long had survived this fate. 

Shin-Lu Belvedere is the older sister to her younger twin brother Shen-Long. She cares about her younger brother a lot as an older sister should, but she is frustrated with his condescending and sardonic attitude towards Kai Kudō, a newcomer recruited into ASHURUM. She initially began developing some sort of affection for Kai, as evidenced by baking a cake for him. During one of the first missions assigned to Kai's division during the beginning of the anime, she was rendered comatose by a telepathic attack on her mind, which immediately affected Shen-Long because of their telepathic link. Later on she was revived, but upon being found by Shen-Long she revealed to be brain washed after recovering. Shin-Lu then engaged in a vicious psychic battle with her younger brother, but was seemingly snapped out of her brainwashing when she mortally wounded Shen-Long. 

Yuki Tokugawa is Asuka's foster brother and one of the few residents of Gald, a run-down city led by crime syndicates. He takes odd jobs for money, which he uses to support his younger foster sister and himself. He also takes care of the orphaned kids that do not have a family. When Kai Kudō winds up in Gald after a devastating explosion caused by Shen-Long Belvedere, Yuki instinctively distrusts him because of his esper heritage and even came close to shooting him, but allows Kai to stay at his house for a while and later becomes one of his strongest allies against ASHURUM. He later aids Kai in rescuing his younger sister Hikaru from Eiji's clutches while Kai goes and distracts Eiji in a decisive battle. 

Asuka Tokugawa is a resident of a run-down city named Gald, and is the younger foster sister of Yuki. Orphaned before the start of the anime, she was among the first children in Gald that Yuki started taking care of, and now ended up living with him. Asuka adores animals and had developed a habit of taking in any strays that she finds. She is kind and caring, but dislikes being useless. Asuka often makes well-intended attempts to help around the house, but her cooking is horrible to the point Yuki has banned her from their kitchen, to her chagrin. She is later revealed to be an empath, a person who "senses" the feelings of others, as she explains to Kai. It was Asuka who introduces Kai to the kinder side of humanity, making him side with them in the end. After the events of the series, Asuka is shown standing with Kai's sister Hikaru, showing her the stars for the first time. 

Eiji Sagimiya is the mysterious head of ASHURUM, a corporation that protects espers, known as "E's", from those who would rather have them dead. He was the one who brought the Kudō siblings Kai and Hikaru to ASHURUM long after they were orphaned, bringing medical care for Hikaru, who became ill with an unknown sickness. At first Eiji is a kind but firm person, and protective of the espers under his care, and is even trusted by Kai. He oversees the activities of ASHURUM, organizing "missions" for the espers that seem to have a benefit for outside society, hoping the espers will eventually receive equal treatment. However, in reality he is revealed to be manipulative and has inner motives. He desires to destroy the majority of Earth's population and reshape it into a world where only espers live, without having to deal with prejudice and racism against their kind, which was why he kept Hikaru and Kai because of their immensely powerful psychic abilities. However, Kai found out from Shen-Long about Eiji's involvement with Hikaru and intervened with his plans, resulting in a final decisive battle that revealed Eiji as one of the espers. 

Maria is a witch and the granddaughter of Erimiya. She befriends Yuki and later aids him in his quest to bring down ASHURUM. 

Erimiya is the grandfather of Maria, a witch, and the local wise man of Gald. He has precognitive abilities, and it is because of this why Eiji highly values him. He was kept hidden from those who seek to exploit him for his knowledge of the future or kill him. Erimiya serves as one of the key players in predicting the final battle between humanity and ASHURUM's espers. He is responsible for telepathically attacking Shin-Lu and causing Shen-Long to go berserk and destroying much of Gald.

Media

Manga
Written and illustrated by Satoru Yuiga, E's was first serialized in GFantasy in 1997. The individual chapters were then compiled into 16 tankōbon volumes by Square Enix. The first volume was released on March 18, 2003, with the final volume released on February 27, 2010.

The series licensed for an English-language release in North America by Broccoli Books. However Broccoli International USA closed down at the end of 2008 and stopped all printing in progress and have halted release of new works.  As of October 2007, the company has published four volumes of the series. The series is also licensed for regional language releases in German by Carlsen Comics and in Chinese by Tong Li Publishing.

Anime
Studio Pierrot adapted the manga series into a twenty-six episode anime series entitled . Directed by Masami Shimoda, the episodes debuted in Japan on April 1, 2003, on TV Tokyo; the final episode aired on September 23, 2003.

ADV Films licensed the anime series for North American distribution in 2004. It initially released the series across 6 DVD volumes, with the first volume released on February 15, 2005, and the final volume released March 21, 2006. On December 12, 2006, the company re-released the entire series in a single five-disc box set. ADV Films also released the series in Germany, with German dubbing provided by Elektrofilm.

The anime series uses two pieces of theme music.  performed by Suitei-Shōjo is used for the series opening theme, while "Tonight/Midnight" by Chicochair is used for the ending theme.

Episode listing

Light novels
Two light novels adaptations of the manga, also written by Yuiga, have been published by Square Enix. The first volume, E's The Time to Baptisma, was published on February 26, 1999. The second volume, E's Unknown Kingdom, followed on January 27, 2000.

Drama CDs
Square Enix released three drama CDs based around the manga. The first, E's Volume 1 was released on September 25, 1999. The second, E'S Vol Extra, followed on March 24, 2000. The final volume, E's Volume 2, which used the same voice actors as the anime adaptation, was released on September 26, 2003, after the television broadcast concluded.

Other media
, published by Square Enix in August 2003, is a guidebook containing additional information about the various fictional aspects of the series, characters, etc.

eSpecial: E's Postcard Book contains fifteen postcards featuring characters from the series was published in March 2003.

References

External links
 Official GFantasy E's website 
 Official Studio Pierrot E's Otherwise anime website 
 

1997 manga
1999 Japanese novels
2000 Japanese novels
2003 anime television series debuts
Action anime and manga
ADV Films
Fantasy anime and manga
Light novels
Gangan Comics manga
Science fiction anime and manga
Shōnen manga
Pierrot (company)
TV Tokyo original programming